Karl Algot Lönn (18 December 1887 – 3 April 1953) was a Swedish road racing cyclist who competed in the 1912 Summer Olympics. He was part of the team, which won the gold medal in the Team road race. In the individual road race he finished tenth.

References

External links
 
 
 
 

1887 births
1953 deaths
Swedish male cyclists
Cyclists at the 1912 Summer Olympics
Olympic cyclists of Sweden
Olympic gold medalists for Sweden
Olympic medalists in cycling
People from Eskilstuna
Medalists at the 1912 Summer Olympics
Sportspeople from Södermanland County
19th-century Swedish people
20th-century Swedish people